The Symphony No. 73 in D major, Hoboken 1/73, is a symphony by Joseph Haydn composed in 1782. It is often known by the subtitle La chasse (The Hunt) due to the hunting horn calls in the final movement, a popular trope in eighteenth century music.

Movements

The symphony is scored for flute, two oboes, bassoon, two horns and strings. Some versions also include two trumpets and timpani which appear only in the Finale.

Adagio — Allegro
Andante,  in G major
Menuetto & Trio: Allegretto
La chasse Presto

The first movement displays one of Haydn's favorite musical devices, turning accompaniment into melody.  Here, this is done in the simplest possible manner by constructing the main theme out of repeated notes.  Once the repeated-note theme is established, then any time repeated notes are used in accompaniment, it sounds to the listener like thematic counterpoint.

The second movement is based on Haydn's song Gegenliebe, Hob. XVIIa:16.  The song forms the refrain for a rondo.  The contrasting episodes of the rondo are derived from the song-melody and are all in the minor.

The final movement was originally composed as the overture to Haydn's opera La fedeltà premiata (“Fidelity Rewarded”), a detail which has helped secure the dating of the symphony. The hunting melody of the finale is a quotation from La Chasse du cerf, a Divertissement for solo voices, chorus, and instrumental ensemble by the eighteenth century French composer Jean-Baptiste Morin. Morin himself drew upon the popular Sourcillade (or Vue) penned by André Danican Philidor in the first decade of the 18th century. Haydn's theme was therefore widely recognisable as a hunting motif.

Along with the famous coda to the Farewell Symphony, La Chasse is one of the few Haydn symphonies to end quietly.

See also
List of symphonies by name

Notes

References
Alexander L. Ringer, The "Chasse" as a Musical Topic of the 18th Century, Journal of the American Musicological Society, Vol. 6, No. 2. (Summer, 1953)

External links

Symphony 073
1782 compositions
Compositions in D major